Federation of Pakistan may refer to:

 The country of Pakistan, referred to as Federation of Pakistan in the constitution and other government documents
 Dominion of Pakistan (1947–1956)